Hungrvaka ("Hunger-waker") is an Old Norse history of the first five bishops of Skálholt. The text covers the period from the formation of the Icelandic church to 1178. As the text refers to Saint Thorlak (acknowledged 1198), Jón Ögmundsson (acknowledged as a local Icelandic saint in 1200), and Gizzur Hallsson (died 1206), it was probably written in the first half of the thirteenth century. However, the manuscripts witnesses of the saga are all post-medieval, the earliest dating from 1601. Because of similarities in style it is assumed that the author of Hungrvaka wrote Páls saga biskups and may also have written passages of Þorláks saga helga.

The reason for the book's title is given by the author in the introduction:

Bibliography

Manuscripts 
A comprehensive treatment of the manuscripts can be found in Ásdís Egilsdóttir's introduction to Hungrvaka in the most recent edition of the text, and summarised by Basset.

The main manuscripts represent three versions of the text:
 AM 380 4to, AM 379 4to (B)
 AM 205 fol., AM 375 4to, AM 378 4to (C)
 AM 110 8vo (D)

Editions

Translations

References 

Medieval literature
Icelandic literature
Bishops' sagas